Johannes Thingnes Bø (born 16 May 1993) is a Norwegian biathlete. He represents  and is the younger brother of biathlete Tarjei Bø. At the Olympic Games in Beijing 2022, they became the first siblings to have individual medals in the same biathlon event. Thingnes Bø has won the Biathlon World Cup in 2018/19, 2019/20, 2020/21, and 2022/2023. Thingnes Bø is described as being powerful on his skis and is the third most successful male biathlete of all time in the World Cup with 66 individual World Cup victories, including victories at the Winter Olympic Games.

Career

2010–2012
Thingnes Bø won several international medals in 2010 and 2011. In 2012 he became a junior world champion for the third time. In April 2012 he was drafted for the Norwegian senior National Team. 18 years old at the time, he is one of the youngest Norwegians ever to be drafted for the national biathlon team.

2018/19 season: Setting new records for World Cup dominance

The new king of biathlon
Having come very close to beating Fourcade in the previous World Cup season, Thingnes Bø was widely considered the prime contender to Fourcade for the overall World Cup in 2018/19. But an injury-marred autumn with a back injury left severe question marks about Thingnes Bøs shape for the beginning of the new season. These questions were made to shame when Thingnes Bø found himself as the winner of the opening sprint race in Sjusjøen (not a part of the IBU World Cup calendar). In the initial World Cup events Thingnes Bø confirmed his great shape by winning six of eight individual races before Christmas. Having scored 428 points in eight races, Thingnes Bø lead the world cup by 116 points over Russian and former doping offender Alexander Loginov. Meanwhile, the expected rival Martin Fourcade was in fifth place and trailing Thingnes Bø with 165 points. Thingnes Bø was now the hot favourite for winning the overall World Cup despite having only raced 8 out of a season-total of 26 individual races.

Podium streak in January
After Christmas break, Thingnes Bø continued to dominate the World Cup events. From and including the first world cup events in Oberhof until the world cup events in Soldier Hollow, Thingnes Bø did not once leave the podium in an individual race. At this point, Thingnes Bø had won 12 out 16 individual races (with one sprint race in Canmore being cancelled), while there were still nine more individual races to go. However, Thingnes Bø did not extend his streak of podium finishes in Soldier Hollow, where a sub-par standing shooting with four missed shots cost him the victory in the initial sprint race. The following pursuit race saw Thingnes Bø deliver another mediocre performance on the shooting range as he finished fourth. Thingnes Bø later showed great sportsmanship and admitted that he had not fired all five shots at the last standing shooting. As a penalty for his offense, he agreed with the IBU to receive 0 instead of the 43 world cup points that his fourth-place finish would otherwise have netted him. The poor standing shooting in Soldier Hollow quickly fuelled considerations among experts and fans about whether Thingnes Bø would run into the same shooting problems in the upcoming World Championships in Östersund, where wind conditions are generally very difficult.

World Championships in Östersund
Thingnes Bø strongly started the 2019 World Championships as he outskied everyone to take home the title as World Champion in the sprint race – despite one missed shot (everyone else in the top eight shot clean), Thingnes Bø comfortably won the sprint race ahead of new rival Alexander Loginov, who was, at the time, still in second position in the overall world cup. The next race was the pursuit race, where Thingnes Bø was, by a large time advantage from the sprint race, the overwhelming favourite to take a second consecutive gold medal. Thingnes Bø lived up to his favourite status in the initial part of the race and led the race with almost one minute coming into the last standing shooting. However, another breakdown on the shooting range meant that Ukrainian underdog Dmytro Pidruchnyi left the shooting range in first place, with Thingnes Bø following in second place 15 seconds behind. Thingnes Bø, surprisingly, did not catch Pidruchnyi on the final loop and had to settle for a silver medal after a dramatic last-loop chase. Thingnes Bø then delivered two disappointing performances in the Individual 20k (9th place) and the mass start (13th place). However, Thingnes Bø won three additional gold medals in the team events.

New record-holder
Having won 13 races throughout the season and effectively securing himself the crystal globe as the winner of the Overall World Cup, Thingnes Bø had only three more races left on home soil in Holmenkollen before the season ended. The last world cup event in Holmenkollen turned out great for Thingnes Bø, who won in all three races. With 16 individual victories, he thus became the record holder of the most individual world cup races won in a single season, surpassing the previous 14 victories set by Martin Fourcade two years earlier in the 2016/17 season.

2019/20 season: Parental leave and another world cup title

Pre-season speculations
Arguably the main talking point coming into the new season (2019/20) was whether Thingnes Bø could retain his dominance from the previous season. Most bookmakers, experts and fans predicted another Thingnes Bø-victory in the world cup, although his favourite status had diminished with the knowledge that Thingnes Bø would have to leave for multiple world cup events in January because he had to go on parental leave. Thingnes Bø dismissed the idea that he would even fight for the overall world cup title because of his January absence, and he instead insisted that his goals were instead the World Championships, which were held in one of Biathlon's most iconic places, Antholz-Anterselva.

Season-opening
The non-official season-opening in Sjusjøen was not a success for Thingnes Bø, who felt heavy on the tracks and only managed fourth in the sprint race, beaten by rival Fourcade, who finished third with similar shooting. In the first world cup competitions in Östersund, Thingnes Bø turned things around in his own favour, and he convincingly took the yellow bib with an emphatic victory in the sprint race ahead of his elder brother, Tarjei. Just as Thingnes Bø looked like he was back to his best, disaster struck in the Individual 20k, where relatively poor Norwegian skis ruined Thingnes Bøs competition. The French waxing team had found the perfect formula for the tricky snow conditions, and as a result, Thingnes Bø was passed by Fourcade, who went on to take the yellow jersey from Thingnes Bø in an all-French podium.

Dominance before Christmas
Casting aside the equipment failure in Östersund, Thingnes Bø found himself back on the top in the next World Cup stage in Hochfilzen, where he won both individual competitions. In the following world cup stage, Thingnes Bø once again spoiled the French party in Le Grand-Bornand, Annecy. The outstanding ski speed of the previous season was starting to manifest itself again, with Thingnes Bø taking an impressive fourth-place finish in the sprint race despite shooting two misses. The pursuit race saw Thingnes Bø take another world cup victory, and the following mass start, where Thingnes Bø won by over 40 seconds to Emilien Jacquelin, cemented his status as the best biathlete in the world. Going into the Christmas break, Thingnes Bø had won five of seven individual competitions and secured an advantage of 61 points to his brother Tarjei who was second in the overall world cup.

World championships
Thingnes Bø was the most successful male athlete at the World Championships, with six total medals, including three in individual competitions. The success did not come immediately for Thingnes Bø, however. Still not in top shape after his absence in January, Thingnes Bø delivered a sub-par sprint race to only finish fifth. The pursuit race indicated an increase in form, as Thingnes Bø took the silver medal. Despite his status as the best skier in biathlon, Thingnes Bø lost the fight with Frenchman Emilien Jacquelin on the last loop, where a tactical blunder in the finale left Thingnes Bø vulnerable to Jacquelin's explosive sprint. Thingnes Bø took another silver medal in the Individual 20k, where rival Fourcade beat him. A missed shot at the last standing shooting likely cost Thingnes Bø the gold medal since a clean shooting would have sent him out on the last loop ahead of Fourcade. With no individual gold medals to his name, the pressure was high on Thingnes Bø in the last individual race of the championships, the men's mass start. Thingnes Bø duly delivered and secured the gold medal with clean 20/20 shooting and fast skiing. Having also won medals in all team events he entered, Thingnes Bø managed to win six out of seven possible medals in the championships.

Nove Mesto and wax gate
In early March, Thingnes Bø was in even better ski shape in the next World Cup events in Nové Město na Moravě, Czech Republic (held with no spectators at the venue as a security measure against the COVID-19 pandemic). Thingnes Bø skied incredibly fast and shot clean in the opening sprint race, which automatically catapulted him to another World Cup victory. The following mass start race saw Thingnes Bø deliver another masterclass performance, winning the race with three missed shots and out-skiing French nemesis Emilien Jacquelin on the final loop. Much like the Individual 20k in Östersund the same season, the race was unusual, as the Norwegian and German waxing teams were unusually successful in their ski-waxing strategy. However, poor shooting from Thingnes Bø throughout the race meant that Thingnes Bø had to catch up after each shooting, and so he eventually managed to catch and pass Emilien Jacquelin on the final loop.

Corona-cancellations and securing the world cup
The competitions in Kontiolahti, the penultimate World Cup stage on the calendar, were also held with no spectators because of the fear of COVID-19 spreading. The mixed events were eventually cancelled. For similar reasons, the competitions in Holmenkollen were also cancelled leaving only two races in Kontiolahti left in the season. Before these races, Thingnes Bø had already managed to overtake Fourcade in the overall World Cup, courtesy of the points system that subtracts the two worst scores of the season (Thingnes Bø could subtract 0 points because he did not start in two (four) competitions in January). However, Thingnes Bø only lead the World Cup with a slim advantage, and he had to deliver two top results to keep the lead. Thingnes Bø did as expected and won the sprint race with Fourcade in second place. It was then made public that Fourcade planned to retire after the following pursuit race, and suddenly the pursuit race was looking to set the stage for a last battle between the two rivals. Thingnes Bø secured his second overall world cup title with a fourth place in the pursuit, while Fourcade won the race and missed out on the overall world cup by two points.

Awards
He was awarded the Holmenkollen Medal in 2021.

Biathlon results
All results are sourced from the International Biathlon Union.

Olympic Games
8 medals (5 gold, 2 silver, 1 bronze)

*The mixed relay was added as an event in 2014.

World Championships
31 medals (17 gold, 10 silver, 4 bronze)

*During Olympic seasons competitions are only held for those events not included in the Olympic program.
**The single mixed relay was added as an event in 2019.

World Cup

Season standings

Standings through 19 March 2023

Individual podiums
 74 victories – (36 Sp, 19 Pu, 13 MS, 5 Ind, 1 Short Ind)
 113 podiums

*Results are from UIPMB and IBU races which include the Biathlon World Cup, Biathlon World Championships.

Team podiums
 37 victories – (23 Relays, 11 Mixed relays, 3 Single mixed relays)
 59 podiums

Distinctions

National distinctions
2012 – Karolineprisen – awarded national talents within culture and sports.

Personal life
He married Hedda Kløvstad Dæhli on 30 June 2018. They have a son together, named Gustav (born 2020)

References

External links

 

1993 births
Living people
People from Stryn
Norwegian male biathletes
Biathletes at the 2014 Winter Olympics
Biathletes at the 2018 Winter Olympics
Biathletes at the 2022 Winter Olympics
Olympic biathletes of Norway
Biathlon World Championships medalists
Medalists at the 2018 Winter Olympics
Medalists at the 2022 Winter Olympics
Olympic gold medalists for Norway
Olympic silver medalists for Norway
Olympic bronze medalists for Norway
Olympic medalists in biathlon
Sportspeople from Vestland